Anne or Ann Richardson may refer to:
 G. Anne Richardson (born 1956), chief
 Anne Vavasour (fl. 1580s), married name Richardson
 Anne Richardson (lawyer) see Obaidullah (detainee)
 Anne Richardson (conservationist), New Zealand conservationist
 Ann Richardson (oncologist), New Zealand oncologist